The South Carolina Scenic Byways consists of roads in the state of South Carolina that travel through areas of scenic, historic, and cultural significance. The intent of this system is to provide travelers with a safe and interesting alternate route.

National scenic byway

State scenic byway

See also

References

External links
 
 South Carolina Scenic Byways
 NSBP: South Carolina

South Carolina
Scenic